Linda Butler (born 1947 or 1948) is an American photographer.

Her work is included in collections of the Museum of Fine Arts Houston and the Birmingham Museum of Art.

References

Living people
1947 births
20th-century American photographers
21st-century American photographers
20th-century American women artists
21st-century American women artists